Ján Hatok (born 11 July 1990) is a Slovak professional footballer who plays for 1. FC Tatran Prešov in 2. Liga as a right-back.

Club career
Hatok made his Fortuna Liga debut for Pohronie against Slovan Bratislava on 20 July 2019

References

External links
 Futbalnet profile 
 
 

1990 births
Living people
Sportspeople from Prešov
Slovak footballers
Slovak expatriate footballers
Association football defenders
1. FC Tatran Prešov players
MFK Vranov nad Topľou players
MFK Karviná players
Czech National Football League players
FK Poprad players
FK Pohronie players
FK Humenné players
Slovak Super Liga players
2. Liga (Slovakia) players
3. Liga (Slovakia) players
Expatriate footballers in the Czech Republic
Slovak expatriate sportspeople in the Czech Republic